The 2009–10 New Zealand one-day competition is the 39th season of official List A domestic cricket in New Zealand. This year there is no sponsor for the one day competition. The season began on 8 December 2009 with Otago Volts playing Wellington Firebirds, Auckland Aces playing Northern Districts Knights and Central Districts Stags playing Canterbury Wizards.

Points table
The winner of the 2009–10 New Zealand one-day competition was found in the final on 21 February 2010.

Teams

Fixture

8 December

17 December

20 December

23 December

28 December

31 December

3 February

6 February

7 February

9 February

Preliminary Finals

13 February

17 February

Final

21 February

See also

Plunket Shield
New Zealand limited-overs cricket trophy
2009–10 Plunket Shield season

One
Domestic cricket competitions in 2009–10
Ford Trophy